Antoine Cervetti (born 19 September 1961) is a French former professional footballer who played as a defender. He made more than 100 appearances in the top flight of French football playing for Bastia, Niort and Lille. He then spent several years with Porto Vecchio before retiring in 1999.

References

1961 births
Living people
Sportspeople from Bastia
Footballers from Corsica
French footballers
Association football defenders
INF Clairefontaine players
SC Bastia players
Chamois Niortais F.C. players
Lille OSC players
Ligue 1 players
Ligue 2 players
INF Vichy players